Branson Robinson (born March 17, 2004) is an American football running back for the Georgia Bulldogs.

Career
Robinson attended Germantown High School in Gluckstadt, Mississippi. A five-star recruit, he played in the 2022 Under Armour All-American Game. Robinson committed to the University of Georgia to play college football.

As a true freshman at Georgia in 2022, Robinson was a backup running back. He was named the SEC freshman of the week after rushing for 98 yards and a touchdown against Auburn.

References

External links
Georgia Bulldogs bio

Living people
Players of American football from Mississippi
American football running backs
Georgia Bulldogs football players
2004 births